The 2014–15 Austrian Football First League was the 41st season of the Austrian second-level football league. It began on 18 July 2014 and ended on 29 May 2015.

League table

Top scorers

References

External links
 

2. Liga (Austria) seasons
2014–15 in Austrian football
Aus